Pope Sixtus II, also written as Pope Xystus II, was bishop of Rome from 31 August 257 until his death on 6 August 258. He was martyred along with seven deacons, including Lawrence of Rome, during the persecution of Christians by the Emperor Valerian.

Life
According to the Liber Pontificalis, he was a Greek, born in Greece, and was formerly a philosopher. However, this is uncertain, and is disputed by modern Western historians arguing that the authors of Liber Pontificalis confused him with the contemporary author Xystus, who was a Greek student of Pythagoreanism.

Sixtus II restored the relations with the African and Eastern churches, which had been broken off by his predecessor over the question of heretical baptism raised by the heresy Novatianism.

In the persecutions under the Emperor Valerian in 258, numerous bishops, priests, and deacons were put to death. Pope Sixtus II was one of the first victims of this persecution, being beheaded on 6 August. He was martyred along with six deacons: Januarius, Vincentius, Magnus, Stephanus, Felicissimus and Agapitus. Lawrence of Rome, his best-known deacon, suffered martyrdom on 10 August, four days after his bishop.

Sixtus is thought by some to be the author of the pseudo-Cyprianic writing Ad Novatianum, though this view has not found general acceptance. Another composition written at Rome, between 253 and 258, is generally agreed to be his.

Legacy
Sixtus II is referred to by name in the Roman Canon of the Mass. The Tridentine Calendar commemorated Sixtus, Felicissimus, and Agapitus on the feast of the Transfiguration of the Lord, 6 August. They remained in that position in the General Roman Calendar until 1969, when, with the abolition of commemorations, the memorial of Sixtus "and his companions" was moved to 7 August, the day immediately after that of their death.

The following inscription honoring Sixtus was placed on his tomb in the catacomb of Callixtus by Pope Damasus I:

See also

List of Catholic saints
List of popes
Sistine Madonna

References

Literature

External links

"St. Xystus, or Sixtus II., Pope and Martyr", Butler's Lives of the Saints
 
 Collected works by Migne Patrologia Latina

258 deaths
3rd-century archbishops
3rd-century Christian martyrs
3rd-century executions
3rd-century Romans
Greek popes
Papal saints
Christian martyrs executed by decapitation
People executed by the Roman Empire
Year of birth unknown
3rd-century popes
Popes